Grete Jorunn Kirkeberg (born 3 September 1964) is a retired Norwegian long-distance runner who specialized in marathon races and cross-country running.

She was on the Norwegian team who won the silver medal at the 1994 IAAF World Half Marathon Championships, having finished 22nd in the individual race. Her highest place from the IAAF World Cross Country Championships was a fifteenth place from 1986. In the team competition there she finished sixth in 1987. She finished 21st in 10,000 metres at the 1986 European Championships and sixteenth in the marathon at the 1997 World Championships. She became Norwegian champion in 5000 m in 1985, 1986 and 1992, in 10,000 m in 1994 and 1996–1998  and in half marathon in 1993.

Achievements

Personal bests 
 5000 metres – 15:45.98 min (1986) – tenth among Norwegian 5000 m runners.
 10,000 metres – 32:37.99 min (1986) – sixth among Norwegian 10,000 m runners.
Half marathon – 1:10:36 hrs (1986) – sixth among Norwegian half marathon runners.
Marathon – 2:35:44 hrs (1988) – ninth among Norwegian marathon runners.

References 

1964 births
Living people
Norwegian female long-distance runners
Frankfurt Marathon female winners
Norwegian female marathon runners
Norwegian female cross country runners